The 1953 Adelaide Carnival was the 12th edition of the Australian National Football Carnival, an Australian football interstate competition. It took place from 8 to 18 July at Adelaide Oval.

Home state South Australia was joined by the two Victorian teams Victoria (VFL) & Victoria (VFA), Western Australia, Tasmania, the
Victoria (VFL) were the best performed side, finishing the carnival unbeaten.

A crowd of 52,632, then a record for an interstate game, attended the game between South Australian and Victoria which would decide the Championship. South Australia, even though they had accounted for Victoria as recently as 1952, were no match on this occasion for their Victorian opponents and lost by 99 points. The VFA team performed admirably, defeating Tasmania and getting within 18 points of Western Australia and 33 points of Victoria.

Tasmania finished the carnival winless and had to play-off against the Australian Amateurs team in order to re-qualify as an 'elite' team come the next carnival.

The youngest player at the carnival was 17-year-old Neil Conlan from Tasmania.

Squads

Results

Qualifying

Main Competition

Ladder

All-Australian team 

The inaugural All-Australian team was named in 1953, based on the performances at the Adelaide Carnival.

Tassie Medal

Goalkicking

References 

 

Australian rules interstate football
Adelaide Carnival, 1953